The Triathlon competitions at the 2011 All-Africa Games were held on Sunday, September 4 in Bilene. Both the men's and women's events were held on the same day.

Events

Medal table

References

External links
Results

2011 All-Africa Games
Triathlon at the African Games
2011 in triathlon